Cichlasoma is a genus of freshwater fish in the cichlid family. The genus was previously very large (a wastebasket taxon), including cichlids from North America, including Central America, and South America.

Reclassification and subsequent splitting of the genus by Sven O. Kullander and other ichthyologists has resulted in removing many of the former species from Cichlasoma to genera such as Amphilophus, Archocentrus, Herichthys, Heros, Nandopsis, Parachromis, Thorichthys, Vieja and others in the tribe Heroini.

Species
According to FishBase, there are currently sixteen recognized species in this genus, but three very different Middle American taxa ("C." geddesi a synonym of Herichthys deppii, and "C." istlanum and "C." trimaculatum placed in Amphilophus) are not included by Catalog of Fishes, effectively limiting Cichlasoma to a group of rather similar, medium-small cichlids of South America.

 Cichlasoma amazonarum S. O. Kullander, 1983
 Cichlasoma araguaiense S. O. Kullander, 1983
 Cichlasoma bimaculatum (Linnaeus, 1758) (Black acara)
 Cichlasoma boliviense S. O. Kullander, 1983
 Cichlasoma dimerus (Heckel, 1840)
 Cichlasoma geddesi (Regan, 1905)
 Cichlasoma istlanum (D. S. Jordan & Snyder, 1899)
 Cichlasoma orientale S. O. Kullander, 1983
 Cichlasoma orinocense S. O. Kullander, 1983
 Cichlasoma paranaense S. O. Kullander, 1983
 Cichlasoma portalegrense (R. F. Hensel, 1870)
 Cichlasoma pusillum S. O. Kullander, 1983
 Cichlasoma santifranciscense S. O. Kullander, 1983
 Cichlasoma taenia (E. T. Bennett, 1831) (Brown coscarob)
 Cichlasoma trimaculatum (Günther, 1867) (Three spot cichlid) 
 Cichlasoma zarskei Ottoni, 2011

References

 
Cichlasomatini
Cichlid fish of Central America
Cichlid fish of North America
Freshwater fish of Mexico
Cichlid genera
Taxa named by William John Swainson